The 4th Canadian Division Support Group (4 CDSG) is a Regular Force Army Formation within the 4th Canadian Division (4 Can Div). 
4 CDSG provides garrison-based institutional support to all Army formations within Ontario, be they deployed in Canada or abroad, and support all lodger units housed in the assigned areas of responsibility.  The current Commander of 4 CDSG is Colonel J.D. Vass.

History 

The formation was established as 2 Area Support Group on 4 February 1999 with its headquarters in Toronto, Ontario. The headquarters was relocated to Garrison Petawawa from Toronto on 28 September 2006. In July 2013, the formation was renamed as 4th Canadian Division Support Group coinciding with an Army-wide reorganization of garrison forces and with the renaming of Land Forces Central Area to 4th Canadian Division.

Mission 

Provide garrison-based institutional support to all CAF (CA, RCN, RCAF, CANSOF, other L1s and Primary and Supplementary Reserve) units within our area of responsibility in order to enable CAF operational readiness and excellence.

Units 

 4 CDSB Petawawa Personnel Services
 4 CDSB Petawawa Operations Services
 4 CDSB Petawawa Technical Services
 4 CDSG Signal Squadron

Branches 
4 CDSG Petawawa Corporate Services

References

External links
 http://www.army-armee.forces.gc.ca/en/4-cdsg/index.page ?

Military units and formations of the Canadian Army
Military logistics units and formations of Canada
Military units and formations established in 1999
1999 establishments in Canada